Lydia E. Kavraki is a Greek-American computer scientist, the Noah Harding Professor of Computer Science, a professor of bioengineering, electrical and computer engineering, and mechanical engineering at Rice University. She is also the director of the Ken Kennedy Institute at Rice University. She is known for her work on robotics/AI and bioinformatics/computational biology and in particular for the probabilistic roadmap method for robot motion planning and biomolecular configuration analysis.

Biography
Kavraki was born in Heraklion  and did her undergraduate studies at the University of Crete. She then moved to Stanford University for her graduate studies, earning a Ph.D. in 1995 under the supervision of Jean-Claude Latombe.

Awards and honors
In 2000, Kavraki won the Grace Murray Hopper Award for her work on probabilistic roadmaps. In 2002, Popular Science magazine listed her in their "Brilliant 10" awards, and in the same year MIT Technology Review listed her in their annual list of 35 innovators under the age of 35.
 In 2010, she was elected as a Fellow of the Association for Computing Machinery "for contributions to robotic motion planning and its application to computational biology." She is also a fellow of the Association for the Advancement of Artificial Intelligence, a fellow of IEEE, a fellow of AIMBE  and a fellow of the American Association for the Advancement of Science. In 2015, she was the winner of the ABIE Award for Technical Leadership from the Anita Borg Institute. In 2017, Kavraki was honored with the ACM Athena Lecturer award from the Association for Computing Machinery, which celebrates women researchers who have made fundamental contributions to the field of Computer Science. In 2020, she was awarded the ACM IEEE Allen Newell Award.

Kavraki is  a member of the National Academy of Medicine (formerly Institute of Medicine (IoM)), the Academy of Athens, the Academy of Medicine, Engineering and Science of Texas (TAMEST), and the Academia Europaea.

References

Year of birth missing (living people)
Living people
Greek computer scientists
Greek emigrants to the United States
American computer scientists
American women computer scientists
Greek women computer scientists
University of Crete alumni
Stanford University alumni
Rice University faculty
Fellows of the American Association for the Advancement of Science
Fellows of the Association for the Advancement of Artificial Intelligence
Fellows of the Association for Computing Machinery
Members of Academia Europaea
Researchers in geometric algorithms
Women systems scientists
Scientists from Heraklion
American women academics
21st-century American women
Members of the National Academy of Medicine